Dinah Jams is the second studio album by vocalist Dinah Washington. It was recorded live In Los Angeles in 1954. Billboard in 1955 wrote: "The instrumental solos are excellent and the entire package is well recorded in a smoothly paced collection of hot and cool jazz."

Track listing

Tracks 2 and 3 are instrumentals.

Personnel
 Dinah Washington - vocals
 Clifford Brown - trumpet
 Maynard Ferguson - trumpet
 Clark Terry - trumpet
 Herb Geller - alto saxophone
 Harold Land - tenor saxophone
 Richie Powell - piano
 Junior Mance - piano
 George Morrow - double bass
 Keter Betts - double bass
 Max Roach - drums

References

Dinah Washington live albums
1954 live albums
EmArcy Records live albums
Albums produced by Bob Shad